Dave Mullins is an American animator at Pixar Animation Studios, best known for his computer-animated short film, Lou (2017), for which he received critical acclaim and was co-nominated for Academy Award for Best Animated Short Film at 90th Academy Awards.

Filmography 
 2018: Incredibles 2 (supervising animator)
 2017: Lou (director, writer) 
 2017: Coco (additional animation) 
 2017: Cars 3 (animator) 
 2015: The Good Dinosaur (additional animation supervision) 
 2015: Inside Out (fix and additional animator) 
 2012: Brave (additional animator) 
 2011: Cars 2 (supervising animator) 
 2009: Up (directing animator) 
 2007: Ratatouille (animator) 
 2006: Mater and the Ghostlight (Video short) (animator) 
 2006: Cars (animator) 
 2005: One Man Band (Short) (animator) 
 2004: The Incredibles (animation character developer) / (animation character development) / (animator) 
 2003: Finding Nemo (animator) 
 2001: Monsters, Inc. (animator) 
 1999: Fantasia 2000 (assistant animator) 
 1999: Stuart Little (animator) 
 1998: Mighty Joe Young (animator) 
 1998: Björk: Hunter (Video short) (animator) 
 1996: Alien Trilogy (Video Game) (animator) 
 1994: Thunder in Paradise (TV Series) (3D animator - 21 episodes)

Awards and nominations
 Nominated: Academy Award for Best Animated Short Film 
 Nominated: San Francisco International Film Festival - Golden Gate Award for Best Family Film 
 Nominated: SXSW Film Festival - SXSW Grand Jury Award for Animated Short

References

External links
 

American animators
American film directors
American animated film directors
American animated film producers
Living people
Pixar people
Year of birth missing (living people)